The 2009 Prosperita Open was a professional tennis tournament played on Hard courts. It was part of the 2009 ATP Challenger Tour. It took place in Ostrava, Czech Republic between April 27 and March 3, 2009.

Singles entrants

Seeds

Rankings are as of April 20, 2009.

Other entrants
The following players received wildcards into the singles main draw:
 Marc Denis
 Matúš Horecný
 Martin Kližan
 Adam Vejmělka

The following players received entry from the qualifying draw:
 Guillermo Alcaide
 Pavol Červenák
 Ivan Dodig
 Jan Hájek

The following players received entry from lucky loser draw:
 Ivo Klec
 Marek Semjan

Champions

Men's singles

 Jan Hájek def.  Ivan Dodig, 7–5, 6–1.

Men's doubles

 Jan Hájek /  Robin Vik def.  Matúš Horecný /  Tomáš Janci, 6–2, 6–4.

References
Official website
ITF search 
2009 Draws

Prosperita Open
Prosperita Open
2009 in Czech tennis
April 2009 sports events in Europe
May 2009 sports events in Europe